Brenda Bakken-Lackey is a Canadian former provincial politician. She was the Saskatchewan Party member of the Legislative Assembly of Saskatchewan for the constituency of Weyburn-Big Muddy from 1999 to 2006.

Known as Brenda Bakken when she first entered electoral politics, she later hyphenated her married name with her maiden name.

References

Women MLAs in Saskatchewan
Saskatchewan Party MLAs
Year of birth missing (living people)
Living people
Canadian people of Norwegian descent
21st-century Canadian politicians
21st-century Canadian women politicians